Mohorič is a Slovene surname. Notable people with the surname include:
Klemen Mohorič (born 1975), Slovenian professional ice hockey goaltender
Matej Mohorič (born 1994), Slovenian road racing cyclist
Matejka Mohorič (born 1978), Slovenian biathlete
Tomislav Mohorić (1926–1990), Croatian swimmer and water polo player
Surnames of Slovene origin

Slovene-language surnames